Oisín Gaelic Athletic Club is a Gaelic Athletic Association sports club in Manchester which plays Gaelic football at senior and junior level, as well as having a growing under-age structure. Oisín is a member club of the Lancashire GAA County Board, the British GAA Provincial Council and the GAA as a whole.

They play in the Lancashire Senior and Junior Championships, Lancashire Senior League, Pennine League, Wolfe Tone League and when qualifying the All Britain Intermediate and All Ireland Junior Championships.

History 
The club was formed in 1904 from the Craobh Oisín Gaelic League Club which was at that time based in Gaythorn, Manchester. The Gaelic League club was involved in promoting music, song, and dance at that time. The formation of a Gaelic football club was an extension to the promotion of all Irish cultural activities in the city.

The club had its home at 7 Cheapside, Manchester, until 1953/1954, when the Gaelic League club ceased to exist and the Oisín GAA club had no official headquarters. This situation was addressed in 1992 when they joined forces with Old Bedians Rugby and Soccer clubs, and a modern clubhouse and playing facilities were built.

In 2004 the club celebrated its centenary year and published a book on its history, entitled "An Scéal". A copy of the book is on display in the GAA Museum in Croke Park.

Under-age

In 1994 Oisín GAA was a major force in Great British Gaelic football. The senior team won the All Britain Intermediate Championship for the club. A large proportion of that team were home grown players.

The Oisín club re-established its underage teams in 2006 and now competes at U-10, U-12 and U-14 levels. In 2008 both the U-10s and the U-12s won the Lancashire League.

Honours

Not surprisingly for a club over one hundred years old, a precise list of the club's major successes is not available. The first major recorded success was in 1949 when the Senior team won the League.
 
All Britain Championship (1)
1994
All Britain Canon Stritch Cup (1)
2001
Lancashire Senior Championship (16)
1951, 1953, 1957, 1959, 1969, 1976, 1977, 1981, 1982, 1994, 2002, 2006, 2017, 2018, 2019, 2020
Lancashire Senior League (8)
1949, 1951, 1969, 1986, 1994, 1995, 2001, 2014, 2019
Lancashire Junior Championship (7)
1990, 1991, 1994, 2003, 2013, 2014, 2015, 2017, 2019
Lancashire Junior League (7)
1982, 1987, 1991, 1994, 1998, 2001, 2003
Wolfe Tone League (6)
1982, 1987, 1993, 2001, 2004, 2008

Notable players
Oisín have had many talented individuals who have passed through the club over the years. Eddie Hogan won a Leinster Senior medal with Kildare in 1956 and Pádraig Johnson won a Leinster Minor medal with Offaly in 1962. As well as representing Offaly at minor level Johnson was also President of the GAA in Britain between 1994 and 1996, the only Oisín member to have held that position.

Peter Quinn of Fermanagh returned to Ireland and later became President of the GAA in 1991, whilst Canon Moss O'Connell went on to the pinnacle of the sport with Senior All-Ireland success with his native Kerry.

Other regular intercounty players of the past include Fr Emmett Fullen RIP (Derry), Eamon Boland (Roscommon), Bob Harrison (Kildare), Kevin McNamee (Meath) and P.J.McGowan (Donegal).
 
Liam and Noel Gallagher of Oasis played Gaelic football at underage level with Oisín CLG.

Facilities 

Old Bedians
Whilst Croke Park has only recently opened its doors to soccer and rugby, Oisín has been working with their sporting counterparts for well over a decade.

It began back in 1921 when the Old Bedian Society was established. It consisted of "Old Boys" from St Bedes College, Whalley Range who provided teams in both rugby and soccer.

In 1965 Old Bedians purchased the land and clubhouse in Millgate Lane from Granada TV. 	   
    	
Old Bedians rebuilt
In April 1991 the clubhouse was destroyed when a stolen car was abandoned and set alight next to it. Several months of dispute with insurers over valuation finally ended in success and the Committee set about rebuilding the clubhouse.

A decision was made to take on board another sport and Oisín GAA accepted the offer. Development moved quickly and land which had previously been unused and other land which was purchased was assigned to Oisín to develop into two playing fields. 	

The final development is a modern clubhouse with changing rooms for eight teams, shower and referee facilities, a function room for up to 120 people and a small members bar.

References

External links 
Oisín CLG Official Website
Lancashire GAA County Board Official Website

Gaelic football clubs in Britain
Sport in Manchester